A Message from the People is a studio album by the American R&B musician Ray Charles, released in 1972. MusicHound R&B: The Essential Album Guide called it "a protest album of sorts."

The album peaked at No. 52 on the Billboard 200.

Production
The album was produced by Quincy Jones. Sid Feller worked on some of the song arrangements.

Charles opens "America the Beautiful" with the third verse of the song, and then returns to the first.

Critical reception

Robert Christgau thought that Charles "turns Melanie's 'What Have They Done to My Song, Ma' into the outcry of black musicians everywhere—which is probably why it rocks (and swings) like nothing he's done in years." Ebony praised Charles's ability to give "wholly new dynamics to those patriotic vintages 'Lift Every Voice And Sing' and 'America The Beautiful'." The New York Times deemed the album "not one of his more memorable outings," writing that "the miracle of Ray Charles’ music is his constant ability to survive his material."

AllMusic wrote that "a gospel feel mixed with R&B locomotion is the engine that drives things here, but [Charles] also uses it to transform Melanie's 'What Have They Done to My Song, Ma' into a syncopated strut, and bring a Sunday Baptist church feel to the Dion hit 'Abraham, Martin and John'." Rolling Stone stated that the interpretation of "America the Beautiful" "added gospel overtones and soulful sway to its source material, pushing Charles’ audience to view the song in a new light."

In politics
The recording of "Hey Mister", a song about government ignoring the needs of poor people, was played during a 1972 Joint Hearing Before the Special Subcommittee on Human Resources and the Subcommittee on Aging of the Committee on Labor and Public Welfare, where it was praised by Senator Alan Cranston.

Although not licensed for political use until the 2020 United States presidential campaign—when the Lincoln Project placed it in a video that urged people to vote out Donald Trump—Charles performed his version of "American the Beautiful" at the 1984 Republican National Convention.

Track listing

Personnel
Ray Charles : vocals, keyboards, producer
Sid Feller : arranger
Mike Post : arranger
Quincy Jones : arranger, producer
David Braithwaite : recording engineer
Freddie Hubbard : trumpet
Ernie Royal : trumpet
Joe Newman : trumpet
Jerome Richardson : reeds
Hubert Laws : reeds
Toots Thielemans : guitar
Eric Gale : guitar
Jim Hall : guitar
Carol Kaye : electric bass (6,7,8,10)
Bob Cranshaw : electric bass
Chuck Rainey : electric bass
Ray Brown : upright bass
Grady Tate : drums
Don Peake : acoustic guitar (10)
Donnie Eubank : congas (6)
The Raelettes : backing vocals

References

Ray Charles albums
1972 albums
ABC Records albums
Albums produced by Quincy Jones